An intermediate appellate court is an appellate court that is not the court of last resort in its jurisdiction.

See also
 Appeal

References
James D Hopkins, "The Role of an Intermediate Appellate Court" (1974 to 1975) 41 Brook L Rev 459 HeinOnline
W Warren H Binford, Preston C Greene, Maria C Schmidlkofer, Robert M Wilsey and Hillary A Taylor, "Seeking Best Practices among Intermediate Courts of Appeal: A Nascent Journey" (2007) 9 The Journal of Appellate Practice and Process 37 (Article 4) (No 1, Spring 2007) Bowen Law Repository.
Calvert Magruder, "The Trials and Tribulations of an Intermediate Appellate Court" (1958) 44 Cornell Law Quarterly 1 (No 1, Fall 1958) Cornell
Laurence C Harmon and Gregory A Lang, "A Needs Analysis of an Intermediate Appellate Court" (1981) 6 or 7 William Mitchell Law Review 51 (article 7) (No 1) Mitchell Hamline
McHugh, "Law Making in an Intermediate Appellate Court: The New South Wales Court of Appeal" (1987) 11 The Sydney Law Review 183 (No 2, March 1987) AustLII
Alan B Handler, "Justice at the Intermediate Appellate Level: The New Jersey Appellate Division" (1979) 10 Seton Hall Law Review 58 Seton Hall University
Daryl R Fair, "State Intermediate Appellate Courts: An Introduction" (1971) 24 Political Research Quarterly 415 (No 3, September 1971) SAGE journals
Richard B Hoffman and Barry Mahoney, "Managing caseflow in State Intermediate Appellate Courts: What Mechanisms, Practices, and Procedures can work to reduce Delay?" (2002) 35 Indiana Law Review 467 McKinney
Kevin M Scott, "Understanding Judicial Hierarchy: Reversals and the Behavior of Intermediate Appellate Judges" (2006) 40 Law & Society Review 163 (No 1, March 2006) JSTOR
John W Poulos and Bruce D Varner, "Review of Intermediate Appellate Court Decisions in California" (1963) 15 Hastings Law Journal 11 (No 1) UC Hastings

Appellate courts